Kadambari Devi (5 July 1859 – 21 April 1884) was the wife of Jyotirindranath Tagore and daughter-in-law of Debendranath Tagore. She was ten years younger than her husband, whom she married on 5 July 1868 (২৫শে আষাঢ়, ১২৭৫ বঙ্গাব্দ),  at the age of nine. Her husband arranged for her to be educated. She was nearly the same age as her brother-in-law Rabindranath Tagore, being only two years older than him.

She inspired young Rabindranath in composing many of his poems with her creative feedback and comments. She was also a good friend and playmate. She was one of the women who played a very important part in his life. Her relationship with Tagore was controversial and had elements of tragedy.

For reasons that are not known, she committed suicide on 21 April 1884, four months after Rabindranath Tagore married. The Tagore family always remained silent about her suicide. Rumours of family problems having led to her suicide have circulated. After Kadambari Devi's death, Rabindranath was completely broken.  For a long time after her death, he wrote many songs and poems in her memory.

In popular culture
 The cult classic Charulata by Satyajit Ray which was based on Rabindranath Tagore's Nastanirh was reported to have been speculated to be based on her life and her relationship with Tagore.
 In Sukanta Roy's Bengali film Chhelebela (2002) Debashree Roy played the character alongside Jisshu Sengupta portraying Tagore.
 In Bandana Mukhopadhyay's Bengali film Chirosakha He (2007) Deepanjana Paul played the character alongside Sayandip Bhattacharya playing Tagore.
 In Rituparno Ghosh's Bengali documentary film Jeevan Smriti (2011) Raima Sen played the character alongside Samadarshi Dutta playing Tagore.
 In Suman Ghosh's Bengali film Kadambari (2015) Konkona Sen Sharma played the character alongside Parambrata Chatterjee portraying Tagore.

References

External links 
 https://m.youtube.com/watch?list=PLEJ8D7mRSBafh9G0B82n0ilmuRQbYYjtd&v=qDUdC_4XxuE
 The Telegraph. Spotlight on the women in Tagore’s life. 7 May 2004.

People from Kolkata
Women from West Bengal
Bengali women artists
19th-century Indian women
19th-century Indian people
1858 births
1884 deaths